JS Hakuryū (SS-503) is the third boat of the s. She was commissioned on 14 March 2011.

Construction and career
Hakuryū was laid down at Mitsubishi Heavy Industries Kobe Shipyard on 6 February 2007 as the 2006 plan 2900-ton submarine No. 8118 based on the medium-term defense capability development plan. At the launching ceremony, the vessel was named Hakuryū and launched on 16 October 2009. The submarine was commissioned on 14 March 2011 and deployed to Kure. Hakuryū belongs to the 5th Submarine Corps, and its homeport is Kure.

On 15 January 2013, she left Kure for training in the United States in Pearl Harbor. Hakuryū returned to Kure on 9 May. The submarine departed Yokosuka for training in the United States on 6 February 2015 and entered Pearl Harbor on 26 February. After calling at Guam, she returned to Kure on 9 May.

Joint training was conducted with the Royal Australian Navy and Air Force, the amphibious assault ship , the frigate  and the supply ship .

From 16 January to 14 April 2018, Hakuryū participated in US dispatch training and conducted offshore training and facility use training in the Hawaiian Islands area.

Gallery

Citations

External links

2009 ships
Sōryū-class submarines
Ships built by Mitsubishi Heavy Industries